Marwin Evans (born April 10, 1993) is an American football strong safety for the Vegas Vipers of the XFL. After high school, Evans attended Highland Community College in Northeast Kansas before transferring to play college football at Utah State.

Professional career

Green Bay Packers
Evans signed with the Green Bay Packers as an undrafted free agent on May 10, 2016. He played in all 16 games in his rookie season primarily on special teams recording six tackles.

On September 1, 2018, Evans was waived by the Packers and was re-signed to the practice squad. He was released on September 11, 2018.

Seattle Seahawks
On January 1, 2019, Evans was signed to the Seattle Seahawks practice squad. He signed a reserve/future contract on six days later after the Seahawks lost to the Dallas Cowboys in the Wild Card Round of the playoffs. He was waived on August 10, 2019.

Dallas Renegades
On November 22, 2019, Evans was drafted by the Dallas Renegades in the 2020 XFL Supplemental Draft. He was waived during final roster cuts on January 22, 2020. He was signed to the XFL's practice squad team, referred to as Team 9, on January 30, 2020. He re-signed with the Renegades on March 9, 2020. He had his contract terminated when the league suspended operations on April 10, 2020.

Winnipeg Blue Bombers
Evans signed with the Winnipeg Blue Bombers of the CFL on January 30, 2021. He was placed on the suspended list on July 9, 2021.

Vegas Vipers
The Vegas Vipers added Evans through the 2023 XFL Draft.

NFL statistics

References

External links
Highland Community College
Green Bay Packers bio
Utah State Aggies bio

1993 births
Living people
Sportspeople from Milwaukee
Players of American football from Milwaukee
American football safeties
Utah State Aggies football players
Green Bay Packers players
Seattle Seahawks players
Dallas Renegades players
Team 9 players
Winnipeg Blue Bombers players
Vegas Vipers players